The  (Sanskrit; Pali ) heaven is an important world of the devas in the Buddhist cosmology.  The word  is an adjective formed from the numeral , "33" and can be translated in English as "belonging to the thirty-three [devas]". It is primarily the name of the second in the six heavens of the desire realm in Buddhist cosmology, and secondarily used of the devas who dwell there. Trāyastriṃśa is ruled by Śakra, also known as Indra.

Description
The  heaven is the second of the heavens of the Kāmadhātu, just above Catumaharajika or the realm of the Four Heavenly Kings, and is the highest of the heavens that maintains a physical connection with the rest of the world.   is located on the peak of Sumeru, the central mountain of the world, at a height of 80 yojanas ; the total area of the heaven is 80 yojanas square.  This heaven is therefore comparable to the Greek Mount Olympus in some respects.

Since  is physically connected to the world through Sumeru, unlike the heavens above it, the  devas are unable to avoid being entangled in worldly affairs. There is, however, marriage between the devas and the asuras just as there is between the Æsir and the jötnar in Norse mythology.

The chief of the  devas is Śakra (Pāli: Sakka), also known as Indra. Other  devas who are frequently mentioned are Viśvakarman (Vissakamma), the devas' craftsman and builder; Mātali, who drives Śakra's chariot; and Sujā, Śakra's wife and daughter of the Asura chief Vemacitrin (Vepacitti).

The Buddha's mother, Maya, was reborn in the Tusita Heaven, and came down to visit  heaven where her son taught her the abhidharma.

The "thirty-three" in the name of the heaven is not an enumeration of the gods who live there (there are far more) but a general term inherited from Vedic mythology, implying "the whole pantheon of gods". In Theravada Buddhist legends, there were 33 humans in Sakka's original group (who made enough merit to become devas atop Mount Sineru). 

In Buddhism, there are "Yāmā devāḥ", "Tushitānāṃ", "Nirmāṇaratayaḥ devāḥ", and "Paranirmita-vaśavartinaḥ devāḥ" above Trāyastriṃśa and "Catumaharajika" below. They are called the six heavens together with Śakro devānām (Śakra). More heaven "Sunirmita devāḥ" is sometimes added to these depending on sūtras.

Levels

In Mahayana literature,  is composed of thirty-three levels and each level rule by 33 gods and goddesses. The original Sanskrit names occasionally vary between extant Sanskrit manuscripts and Chinese texts.



































Residents
Below is a list of the devas who are said to dwell here:
Śakra
Śakra's wives
Sujā
Śakra's sons
Suvira
Susīma
Śakra's daughters
Āśā (Pali: Āsā) (Luck)
Śraddhā (Pali: Saddhā) (Faith)
Śrī (Pali: Sirī) (Glory)
Hrī (Pali: Hirī) (Modesty)
Others
Viśvakarmā – the architect of the devas
Prajāpati
Varuṇa
Īśāna
Mātali – Śakra's charioteer
Pañcaśikha
Suvīra
Susīma
Jālinī
Airāvata – Śakra's elephant mount
Pārileyyaka – an elephant that was reborn in heaven after serving the Buddha

In popular culture
The Dragon Ball series features a location called the Lookout in the English dub and Kami's Temple (神の神殿 kami no shinden) in the Japanese release. This area is reminiscent of Trāyastriṃśa iconographically, as this heaven is traditionally depicted as a flat surface on the top of Mt. Sumeru. There are thirty-two trees on the Lookout, which equate to the same number of palaces in Trāyastriṃśa (not counting the thirty-third, Śakra's palace, exemplified by the hyperbolic time chamber).
In Super Mario Bros. 3, World 5-1 (Sky Land) features a collection of coins that spell out the number "33." This may be in reference to Trāyastriṃśa, which is further implied by this world's introduction of the Tanooki suit. This power-up allows the player to transform into a stone statue of Kṣitigarbha, a bodhisattva whose background is explained in the Kṣitigarbha Sūtra that takes place in Trāyastriṃśa.

See also
 Svarga
 Tridaśa, the Hindu equivalent

References

Buddhist cosmology
Sanskrit words and phrases